known professionally as , is a pop singer, songwriter and pianist.

Biography

Early life
Aki was born in the small town of Itano in Tokushima Prefecture, in the mostly rural island of Shikoku. Her mother is Italian American and her father is Japanese.

Aki began to take piano lessons when she was three years old and lived in Tokushima through sixth grade and spent her junior high school days in Okayama. She has admitted that growing up in rural Japan proved very difficult, as she was bullied and she turned to the piano as an escape from the isolation she felt. She grew up listening to a mix of enka, The Carpenters and The Bee Gees.

Aki moved to Hawaii when she was fifteen years old and attended the Hawaii Preparatory Academy, but transferred to and graduated from Iolani School. She speaks English and Japanese. She was immersed in music there for four years. She graduated from George Washington University in Washington, D.C., and majored in political science.

Personal life
Angela's first marriage was to an engineer, producer and artist Tony Alany, who co-produced her first album These Words in Vienna, Virginia, USA. On March 9, 2007, Aki announced that she had married Japanese A&R director and publisher Taro Hamano, and made public that she had been briefly married previously and got divorced. In September 2011, she announced that she was pregnant. In February 2012, she announced that she had given birth to her first child, a baby boy.

She is good friends with J-Pop star Yuna Ito. The singers attended the same Japanese language school.

Janis Ian is her mentor and friend.

Career

Beginnings
In 1997, Aki went to a Sarah McLachlan concert at age 20 and felt that she wanted to go into the music world, deciding to become a singer-songwriter. In 2000, she released an indie album in the United States, called These Words. After graduation from university, she found a job in Washington, D.C. and worked as a secretary. She could not give up her dream of being a singer, however, and quit her job in 2001. She worked as a waitress for 2 dollars 13 cents during the day, and she played songs at night at a nightclub. Aki briefly married her first album's engineer in Vienna, Virginia, USA. In 2002, she composed two tracks for "Let It Fall" by Dianne Eclar, a teenage pop singer from the Philippines.

Debut in Japan
After producing commercial music for several Japanese companies, including one for milk product Yakult which was sung by US Jazz vocalist Jimmy Scott, she decided to move back to Japan. On September 27, 2003, Aki saw Shiina Ringo's concert in Nippon Budokan Hall, and promised herself she would perform at the same place within three years, even though she was unheard of, had not yet been offered a contract with any record label, nor had she made an album or major debut. She performed live in many small venues and bars in Tokyo while working as a waitress in a Chinese restaurant, wrote 100 or more songs, and also made several demo CDs. 
In 2005, she released an independent mini-album under Virgo Music entitled "One," which was the #1 selling indie album of 2005. This alerted Nobuo Uematsu to her music, and he asked her to write lyrics and perform the theme song for Final Fantasy XII, "Kiss Me Good-Bye".

She contracted with Epic Records and made her major debut with the single "HOME" in September, 2005. The album sold over half a million copies and reached #2 on the Oricon charts.

On December 26, 2006, she held a concert in Nippon Budokan Hall, making history there as the first artist to ever perform in the famous venue solo (with just her piano) -- no backup singers, band or opening act.

Reaching an English audience (2006-2007)
In May 2006, Angela signed with Tofu Records in order to release English singles and albums. Her first release with Tofu was "Kiss Me Good-Bye" as a digital single in the US, with a slightly altered track list. Later that month she performed the Final Fantasy XII theme song, "Kiss Me Good-Bye" at the premiere PLAY! A Video Game Symphony concert in Chicago on May 27, 2006. With orchestral backup, she played piano and sang the English lyrics, which she had written herself. She also performed a cover version of Faye Wong's "Eyes On Me", the theme song of Final Fantasy VIII, with her piano accompaniment.

In 2007 Aki's second major label album, Today, reached #1.

Recent career (since 2009)
In February 2009, Aki released her third full album in Japan, Answer — the first she produced entirely by herself.

Angela Aki was chosen to sing Bob Dylan's "Knockin' on Heaven's Door" with her original Japanese lyrics for the movie Heaven's Door, and was chosen to write and perform the theme song titled “Ai no Kisetsu” for the NHK morning drama Tsubasa broadcast from March 30, 2009.

In September 2010, Aki released her fourth full album in Japan, Life, and then in September 2011 released her fifth full album White.

Songbook, a cover album by Aki, was released on January 11, 2012.

BLUE was released as Aki's 7th full Japanese studio album on July 18, 2012, along with the single from the same album, "Confession" (告白), released July 11, 2012.

On March 5, 2014, Tapestry of Songs: The Best of Angela Aki was released in two versions, the standard version consisting of tracks of singles released since 2005 (通常盤 ESCL-4170), and a two disc version (初回生産限定盤 ESCL-30010), which added songs Aki considered her favourites on the second disc.

In 2014, she announced that she would be putting her music career on hold while she went to America to study music as she prepares herself to take on the role of musical director for a Broadway project being undertaken by a friend.

In 2016, she wrote three original songs for the musical Out of Shadowland at Tokyo DisneySea. The same year, she composed a song for Masayuki Suzuki.

In 2017, she wrote and produced for May J.

Discography

Studio albums
 2001: These Words
 2006: Home
 2007: Today
 2009: Answer
 2010: Life
 2011: White
 2012: Blue

References

External links 

  

1977 births
Living people
Sony Music Entertainment Japan artists
Sony BMG artists
Japanese people of American descent
Japanese women pop singers
Japanese pianists
Japanese women pianists
Video game musicians
Columbian College of Arts and Sciences alumni
People from Hawaii
ʻIolani School alumni
Japanese people of Italian descent
Musicians from Tokushima Prefecture
English-language singers from Japan
Japanese women singer-songwriters
Japanese singer-songwriters
21st-century Japanese women singers
21st-century Japanese singers
21st-century women pianists